David Van der Gulik (born April 20, 1983) is a Canadian former professional ice hockey right winger. He was a draft pick of the Calgary Flames, selected 206th overall in the 2002 NHL Entry Draft, and appeared in six games with the team in 2008–09 before spending four seasons with the Colorado Avalanche and his last North American season with the Los Angeles Kings.

Playing career

Amateur
As a youth, Van der Gulik played in the 1997 Quebec International Pee-Wee Hockey Tournament with a minor ice hockey team from Abbotsford, British Columbia.

Following three seasons of Junior A hockey as an offensive star with the Chilliwack Chiefs of the British Columbia Hockey League, Van der Gulik was selected in the seventh round, 206th overall in the 2002 NHL Entry Draft by the Calgary Flames. He then committed to play College hockey for Boston University, and in 2002–03, Van der Gulik scored 10 goals and 20 points in 40 games as a freshman to be named to the Hockey East All-Rookie Team in 2003.

With a slightly undersized physical frame as a winger, Van der Gulik relied on his offensive ability and hardworking mentality to increase his goal totals in each of his sophomore and junior years. Despite persisting with an abdominal injury in the latter part of his junior campaign he failed to heal prior to his senior year with the Terriers in 2005–06. After missing the first few months of the season with the still undiagnosable injury, Van der Gulik was initially a candidate to be red-shirted and receive another year of college eligibility. However, with ambitions to turn pro the following year, the vexing injury subsided, and Van der Gulik set up the winning goal in his return on December 30, 2005 against Merrimack College. In 25 games as co-captain he totaled 22 points including scoring 2 hat-tricks in the playoffs to help BU progress to the Hockey East finals. Over his four-year Terrier career he amassed 52 goals for 93 points in 141 games and subsequently earned selection in BU's All Decade Team.

Professional
After finishing his collegiate career, Van der Gulik was signed to a two-year entry level contract with the Calgary Flames on May 22, 2006. Attending Calgary's 2006–07 training camp he was then assigned to American Hockey League affiliate, the Omaha Ak-Sar-Ben Knights to start the year. In his first professional season he led all Knights with 80 games and posted 16 goals for 43 points to help Omaha qualify for their first and only playoff appearance. As a rookie, he also led the team with four short handed goals while also setting an impressive franchise record in Plus/minus (+27).

In the 2007–08 season Van der Gulik followed the Knights relocation to Quad City and established himself among the Flames offensive leaders in with 19 goals and 42 points. On a largely underwhelming Quad City team, Van der Gulik proved defensively responsible, finishing as the only Quad City forward in the positive in Plus/minus (+3). On July 1, 2007, he was re-signed as a restricted free agent to a two-year contract by the Flames. Van der Gulik was again reassigned by the Flames to Quad City for the 2008–09 season. Established as an energetic two-way role player he was recalled by Calgary on February 26, 2009 and made his National Hockey League debut, leading Calgary with 6 shots, the following night against the Minnesota Wild. On March 3 he recorded his first NHL point, an assist to set up Warren Peters first NHL goal, in a 6-3 victory over the Ottawa Senators. He finished with six games with the Flames, recording two assists.

Van der Gulik spent the entire 2009–10 season in his hometown with new Flames AHL affiliate, the Abbotsford Heat, finishing second in scoring with 40 points. After four years within the Flames organization he left following the season, signing as a free agent to a one-year contract with the Colorado Avalanche on July 2, 2010. Following attending the Avalanche's training camp, he was reassigned during the pre-season to the Avalanche's AHL affiliate, the Lake Erie Monsters, to begin the 2010–11 season.

His first NHL goal was scored on November 4, 2010 against Cory Schneider of the Vancouver Canucks.

On July 1, 2014, Van der Gulik ended his four-year tenure with the Avalanche organization to sign a one-year contract as a free agent with the Los Angeles Kings. After attending the Kings training camp, Van der Gulik was assigned to AHL affiliate, the Manchester Monarchs. A month into the 2014–15 season, he was recalled and appeared in his first and only game with the Kings, in a 3-0 shutout loss to the Pittsburgh Penguins on October 30, 2014. Upon his return to the AHL, Van der Gulik added a veteran presence in scoring 25 points in 57 games, to contribute in helping the Monarchs capture the Calder Cup.

As a free agent from the Kings in the off-season, Van der Gulik went unsigned over the summer. On November 2, 2015, with little NHL interest, Van der Gulik turned to Europe and signed for the remainder of the season in Germany with Düsseldorfer EG of the DEL.

Career statistics

Awards and honours

References

External links

1983 births
Abbotsford Heat players
Boston University Terriers men's ice hockey players
Calgary Flames draft picks
Calgary Flames players
Canadian ice hockey right wingers
Canadian people of Dutch descent
Chilliwack Chiefs players
Colorado Avalanche players
Düsseldorfer EG players
Sportspeople from Abbotsford, British Columbia
Lake Erie Monsters players
Living people
Los Angeles Kings players
Manchester Monarchs (AHL) players
Omaha Ak-Sar-Ben Knights players
Quad City Flames players
Ice hockey people from British Columbia
Canadian expatriate ice hockey players in Germany